Mäkitalo is Finnish  surname.

List of persons with the surname 

Mika Mäkitalo (born 1985), Finnish footballer 
Östen Mäkitalo (1938 – 2011),  Swedish electrical engineer
Tom Makitalo (born 1995), Swedish ice hockey player

Surnames